Böhm's spinetail, also Bohm's spinetail or Boehm's spinetail, (Neafrapus boehmi), also known as the bat-like spinetail, is a species of swift in the family Apodidae.

It is found in Angola, Botswana, DRC, Kenya, Malawi, Mozambique, Namibia, Somalia, South Africa, Tanzania, Zambia, and Zimbabwe. It occurs in the vicinity of Baobab trees and nests in cavities in the trees.

The name of this bird commemorates the German zoologist Richard Böhm.

References

External links
 Böhm's spinetail - Species text in The Atlas of Southern African Birds.

Böhm's spinetail
Birds of Sub-Saharan Africa
Böhm's spinetail
Taxonomy articles created by Polbot